Albert Charles Taylor Geary (11 September 1900 – 23 January 1989) was an English cricketer. Geary was a right-handed batsman who bowled right-arm medium-fast. He was born in East Croydon, London.

Having played for the Surrey Second XI since 1921 in the Minor Counties Championship, he made his first-class debut for Surrey against Somerset in the 1922 County Championship. It wouldn't be until the 1925 season that he became more of a regular starter in the Surrey XI. By the time he played his final first-class match against Lancashire in the 1931 County Championship, he had made 90 first-class appearances. Geary's role within the team was as a bowler, in his 90 first-class matches he took 198 wickets at an average of 30.64, with best figures of 6/50. These figures, one of six five wicket hauls he took in his career, came against Hampshire in the 1927 County Championship, a season in which he took 79 wickets at an average of 25.15, which was his most successful season of his career. A lower-order batsman, Geary scored 670 runs at a batting average of 10.63, with a high score of 40. His time at Surrey was characterised by him making nearly as many appearances for the Second XI in the Minor Counties Championship as he did for the First XI. With pitches the batsman friendly pitches at The Oval not helping his bowling, with him being all too often overlooked by the Surrey selectors, he left the county at the end of the 1931 season. While playing for Surrey, he stood as an umpire in a first-class match between the Royal Navy and the Royal Air Force.

He soon after moved to Jersey, playing a single match for the Jersey cricket team against the Marylebone Cricket Club in 1934. The match was a success for Geary, with him taking a total of 8 wickets in it, as well as scoring a century in Jersey's first-innings. The match though was not rated as first-class. Geary would go on to take 437 wickets against touring teams in eight seasons for the island. He lived out the remainder of his life on Jersey, with him dying in Saint Peter on 21 January 1989.

References

External links
 Albert Geary at ESPNcricinfo
 Albert Geary at CricketArchive

1900 births
1989 deaths
People from Croydon
English cricketers
Surrey cricketers
English cricket umpires
Jersey cricketers